is a 2009 Japanese film directed by Hiroshi Nishitani. It was followed by the TV drama sequel The Diplomat Kosaku Kuroda and the film sequel Andalucia: Revenge of the Goddess.

Premise
Kuroda is a foreign diplomat working in the coastal town of Amalfi, Italy. He investigates the case of a young Japanese girl kidnapped off the streets of Rome at Christmas, eventually falling in love with the girl's mother.

Cast
 Yūji Oda as Kōsaku Kuroda
 Yūki Amami as Saeko Yagami
 Kōichi Satō as Masaki Fujii
 Erika Toda as Kanae Adachi
 Nene Otsuka as Yoshimi Haba
 Akira Onodera
 Shirō Sano as Michio Nishino
 Sarah Brightman herself
 Rocco Papaleo as inspector Bartolini
 Masaharu Fukuyama (special appearance) as Shōgo Saeki 
 Kiichi Nakai as the voice of Hiroshi Kataoka

References

External links
   
 

2009 films
Films adapted into television shows
Films directed by Hiroshi Nishitani
Japanese mystery films
Films shot in Italy
2000s Japanese films
2000s Japanese-language films
Films produced by Kazutoshi Wadakura
Toho films